James Anderson (November 6, 1902 – November 26, 1960) was an American assistant director during the 1930s, 1940s and 1950s.  In his twenty-five year career, Anderson worked on almost 75 pictures. He is sometimes confused with James K. Anderson, the actor, because their careers overlapped. He was also known as James A. Anderson or James H. Anderson.

Anderson began his career in film as an actor with a featured role in the silent era, in 1925's The Freshman, starring Harold Lloyd. After appearing in several silent films, with the advent of sound he moved behind the camera, where he was a perennial assistant director. He would spend almost his entire career with RKO Radio Pictures, from their inception in 1929 through 1949.

As an assistant director he would work with such famous directors as George Archainbaud, William A. Wellman, Walter Lang, Garson Kanin, Dorothy Arzner, Leo McCarey, and Ida Lupino. Late in his career he would also work as a unit or production manager on several films, including the classic Mr. Blandings Builds His Dream House in 1948. His final film credit would be on the small screen, as the assistant director and production manager for the 1957 episode "The Mothers", on Lupino's television series, Mr. Adams & Eve. Anderson died on November 26, 1960, in Los Angeles, California.

Filmography
(as per AFI's database)

References

External links
 

American male silent film actors
20th-century American male actors
1902 births
1960 deaths
Artists from Springfield, Massachusetts